Ricardo "Ricky" Soares Pinheiro (born 1 February 1989 in Kaiserslautern, West Germany) is a Portuguese footballer who plays for SV Morlautern.

Career 
Pinheiro began his career with 1. He made his debut on the professional league level in the 2. Bundesliga for the first team on 5 October 2008, when he came on as a substitute in the 81st minute in a game against TuS Koblenz. In December 2009, he was loaned to VfL Osnabrück until the end of the season.

References

External links 
 
 
 Ricky Pinheiro at FuPa

1989 births
Living people
People from Kaiserslautern
German people of Portuguese descent
Portuguese footballers
Association football midfielders
2. Bundesliga players
3. Liga players
Regionalliga players
1. FC Kaiserslautern players
1. FC Kaiserslautern II players
VfL Osnabrück players
KSV Hessen Kassel players
SV Elversberg players
Borussia Neunkirchen players
Wormatia Worms players
FK Pirmasens players
Footballers from Rhineland-Palatinate